The 1934 United States Senate election in Wisconsin was held on November 6, 1934.

Incumbent Republican U.S. Senator Robert La Follette Jr. left his party and, with his brother Philip, formed the new Wisconsin Progressive Party. La Follette was re-elected on the Progressive ticket over Democrat John M. Callahan and Republican John B. Chapple.

Progressive primary

Candidates
Robert M. La Follette Jr., incumbent Senator since 1925

Results

Republican primary

Candidates
 John B. Chapple, nominee for U.S. Senate in 1932

Results

Democratic primary

Candidates
 Gertrude Bowler, Democratic Party activist and anti-Prohibitionist
 John M. Callahan, former Wisconsin Democratic Party chairman (1925–27) and nominee for Wisconsin Secretary of State in 1910 and 1924
 William D. Carroll, State Senator from Prairie du Chien
 Charles E. Hammersley, candidate for Governor in 1930
 Francis E. McGovern, former Governor of Wisconsin (1911–15)

Results

General election

Candidates
 John B. Chapple, candidate for U.S. Senate in 1932 (Republican)
 John M. Callahan, former Wisconsin Democratic Party chairman (Democratic)
 Fern Dobbins (Independent Communist)
 Robert M. La Follette Jr., incumbent Senator since 1925 (Progressive)
 Theodore Lee (Independent Prohibition)
 James P. Sheehan (Socialist)

Results

See also 
 1934 United States Senate elections

References 

1934
Wisconsin
United States Senate